Yassin Maouche (born 23 July 1997) is a French footballer who plays as a midfielder for Swiss club Schaffhausen.

Professional career
After a promising debut season with Servette in the Swiss Challenge League, Maouche signed his first professional contract with Zürich on 6 July 2017. Maouche made his professional debut with FCZ in a 2–0 Swiss Super League win over Sion on 10 August 2017.

On 1 February 2019, Maouche was relegated to the U-21 squad, which plays in the third-tier Swiss Promotion League.

On 16 February 2021, he signed with Schaffhausen.

Personal life
Maouche was born in France and is of Algerian descent. His brother Mohamed Maouche is also a professional footballer.

References

External links
 
 UEFA Profile
 FCZ Profile
 SFL Profile

1997 births
Sportspeople from Haute-Savoie
French sportspeople of Algerian descent
Living people
French footballers
Association football midfielders
Servette FC players
FC Zürich players
FC Schaffhausen players
2. Liga Interregional players
Swiss Super League players
Swiss Challenge League players
Swiss Promotion League players
French expatriate footballers
French expatriate sportspeople in Switzerland
Expatriate footballers in Switzerland
Footballers from Auvergne-Rhône-Alpes